Cricket clothing and equipment is regulated by the laws of cricket. Cricket whites, sometimes called flannels, are the loose fitting clothes which are worn while playing cricket so as not to restrict the player's movement. Use of protective equipment, such as cricket helmets, gloves and pads, is also regulated.

Clothing and protective gear 

 Collared shirt (white in tests domestic; as per team kit in one day formats[international]) with short or long sleeves depending on the climate or personal preference.
 Long trousers (white in tests and domestic; as per team kit in one day formats[international]).
 Jumper (a woollen pullover, if necessary). This is usually a vest.
 Sun hat, cricket cap or baseball cap.
 Spiked shoes to increase traction.
Protective equipment
 Jockstrap with cup pocket into which a "box", or protective cup, is inserted and held in place.
 Abdominal guard or "box" or an Guard for batters and wicket-keepers (often referred to as a cup, box or abdo guard). It is usually constructed from high density plastic with a padded edge, shaped like a hollow half-pear, and inserted into the jockstrap with cup pocket underwear of the batters and wicket-keeper. This is used to protect the crotch area against impact from the ball.
 Helmet (often with a visor), worn by batters and fielders close to the batter on strike to protect their heads.
 Leg pads, worn by the two batters and the wicket-keeper, used to protect the shin bone against impact from the ball. The wicket-keeping pads are slightly different from the batters'. Fielders that are fielding in close to the batters may wear shin guards under their trousers. 
 Thigh guard, arm guards, chest guard, and elbow guards to protect the body of the batters. Some batters use these and others do not, since they reduce mobility. 
 Gloves for batters only, thickly padded above the fingers and on the thumb of the hand, to protect against impact from the ball.
 Wicket-keeper's gloves for the wicket-keeper. Usually includes webbing between the thumb and index fingers.

Batters are allowed to wear gloves while batting. The batter can be also caught out if the ball touches the glove instead of the bat, provided the hand is in contact with the bat. This is because the glove is considered to be the extension of the bat. The batters may also wear protective helmets, usually with a visor, to protect themselves. Helmets are usually employed when facing fast bowlers. While playing spinners, it might not be employed (though injuries are still possible).

Fielders cannot use gloves to field the ball. If they wilfully use any part of their clothing to field the ball they may be penalised 5 penalty runs to the opposition. If the fielders are fielding close to the batter, they are allowed to use helmets and leg guards worn under their clothing.

As the wicket-keeper is positioned directly behind the batter, and therefore has the ball bowled directly at them, they are the only fielder allowed to wear gloves and (external) leg guards.

Cricket clothing is generally white In Test cricket, as is traditional, but limited-overs cricket players generally have clothing based on team colors, similar to other sports.

Equipment 

 Ball – A red, white or pink ball with a cork base, wrapped in twine covered with leather. The ball should have a circumference of  unless it is a children's size.
 Bat – A wooden bat is used. The wood used is from the Kashmir or English willow tree. Aluminum bats are not allowed. The bat has a long handle and one side has a smooth face.
 Stumps – three upright wooden poles that, together with the bails, form the wicket.
 Bails – two crosspieces made of wood, placed on top of the stumps.
 Sight screen – A screen placed at the boundary known as the sight screen. This is aligned exactly parallel to the width of the pitch and behind both pairs of wickets.

See also
 Street cricket, where much of the equipment isn't used or is replaced with easier-to-find alternatives

 Sports uniform

References

 
Sportswear
Cricket